Windoc may refer to:

, a freighter that struck a bridge on the Welland Canal in 1938.
, a freighter that struck a bridge on the Welland Canal in 2001.